XHPVAT-FM is a radio station on 88.3 FM in Maravatío, Michoacán. It is known as Sensitiva 88.3.

History
XHPVAT was awarded in the IFT-4 radio auction of 2017 and was the only station won by a consortium, consisting of Leopoldo González Cruz, Cristopher González Cruz, and Leopoldo Neftalí González Cruz. The consortium was formed as a company, Mr Pool Music, prior to the formal awarding of the station's concession on June 27, 2017.

Sensitiva was the first new station to go on as a result of IFT-4.

References

Radio stations in Michoacán
Radio stations established in 2017
2017 establishments in Mexico